Seghin or Saghin may refer to:
 Seghin, Baft, Kerman Province (سغين - Seghīn)
 Saghin, Kerman, Kerman Province (سغين - Saghīn)
 Seghin, Rabor, Kerman Province (صغين - Şeghīn)